Ormslev  is a small village in Aarhus Municipality, Central Denmark Region in Denmark with a population of 353 (1 January 2022).

Route E45 passes by immediately west of Ormslev.

History 
The church in Ormslev is probably very old, but a large part of it is later additions and the whole church was thoroughly reconstructed in 1739.

The area around Ormslev has been cultivated as farmland a long way back, as part of the historic and influential manor of Constantinsborg. Constantinsborg has been a manor for the nobility from at least the 15th century and is also an important agricultural producer today. From 1902 to 1956 the settlement of Ormslev became a railway town along the now abandoned Hammelbanen rail road line, and the village attracted some industry, including a grain mill, a dairy and some craftsmen. Half a kilometre southwest, marl was mined and transported by rail and the local farmers sent off their vegetables to market. Beginning in the 1930s, however, the small industrious village saw a decline and the rail road line was later abandoned altogether. The former train station, situated about half a kilometre northwest of the village on a lower elevation, has since been preserved and restored.

Gallery

References

Sources 
 Asger Christiansen: Hammelbanen, bane bøger 1996, s. 109 f. og s. 134 
 Aarhus Kommune (2009): Renovation of Ormslev train station
 Danmarks Kirker: Ormslev Kirke Nationalmuseet  Summary in English

External links 

 Ormslev Church
 Aarhus Aadal Golf Club

Towns and settlements in Aarhus Municipality
Cities and towns in Aarhus Municipality